Sir Martin Archer Shee  (23 December 1769 – 13 August 1850) was an Irish portrait painter. He also served as the president of the Royal Academy.

Early life
He was born in Dublin, of an old Irish Roman Catholic family, the son of Martin Shee, a merchant, who regarded the profession of a painter as an unsuitable occupation for a descendant of the Shees. His son Martin nevertheless studied art in the Royal Dublin Society and came to London. There, in 1788, he was introduced by Edmund Burke to Joshua Reynolds, on whose advice he studied in the schools of the Royal Academy of Arts.

Career
In 1789, he exhibited his first two pictures, the "Head of an Old Man" and "Portrait of a Gentleman." Over the next ten years he steadily increased in practice. He was chosen an associate of the Royal Academy in 1798.

In 1789, he married Mary, eldest daughter of James Power of Youghal, and in 1800 he was elected a Royal Academician. He moved to George Romney's former house at 32 Cavendish Square, and set up as his successor. In addition to his portraits he executed various subjects and historical works, such as Lavinia, Belisarius, his diploma picture "Prospero and Miranda", and the "Daughter of Jephthah".

Writing

In 1805 he published a poem consisting of Rhymes on Art, and a second part followed in 1809. Lord Byron spoke well of it in his English Bards and Scotch Reviewers. Shee published another small volume of verse in 1814, entitled The Commemoration of Sir Joshua Reynolds, and other Poems, but this was less successful. He also produced a tragedy, Alasco, set in Poland. The play was accepted at Covent Garden, but was refused a licence, on the grounds that it contained treasonable allusions, and Shee angrily resolved to make his appeal to the public. He carried out his threat in 1824, but Alasco was still on the list of unacted dramas in 1911. He also published two novels – Oldcourt (1829, in three volumes) and Cecil Hyde (1834).

On the death of Sir Thomas Lawrence in 1830, Shee was chosen president of the Royal Academy in his stead and shortly afterwards received a knighthood. In 1831, he was elected a Fellow of the Royal Society. 

In an examination before the parliamentary committee of 1836 concerning the functions of the Royal Academy, he ably defended its rights. He continued to paint till 1845, when illness made him retire to Brighton. He was deputised for at the Academy by J. M. W. Turner, who had appointed him a trustee of the projected Turner almshouse. From 1842–49, he was the first president of the Birmingham Society of Artists.

Death
Shee died in Brighton in 1850 and was buried in the western extension to St Nicholas' Churchyard in Brighton.  His headstone remains, but has been laid flat and moved to the perimeter of the site.

Personal life

Shee had three sons, who became successful barristers, and three daughters.  

Descendants of one of the sons was George Archer-Shee, whose story inspired The Winslow Boy, a play written by Sir Terence Rattigan and his older half-brother, Martin Archer-Shee MP. 

Shee's descendant, Mary Archer-Shee, supports the campaign for the fulfilment of Turner's wishes for his bequests.

Written works by Shee (selected)
Elements of art, a poem; in six cantos (1809)
Rhymes on Art; Or, The Remonstrance of a Painter: in Two Parts (1809)
The Commemoration of Reynolds: In Two Parts (1814)
Oldcourt: Volume 1, Volume 2, Volume 3 (London : H. Colburn, 1829)
Alasco: A Tragedy, in Five Acts (Sherwood, Jones, and co., 1824).

Bibliography
 Martin Archer Shee, The Life of Sir Martin Archer Shee, Volume 1, Volume 2 (London: Longman, Green, Longman, and Roberts, 1860).

Notes

References

External links

 
Sir Martin Archer Shee online (ArtCyclopedia)
Biography of M. A. Shee (Encyclopedia of Irish and World Art)
William Archer Shee, the artist's son (Oil on canvas, Ca. 1820 – Metropolitan Museum of Art)
Portrait by Thomas Bridgford 

1769 births
1850 deaths
People from County Dublin
18th-century Irish painters
19th-century Irish painters
Irish male painters
Irish portrait painters
Royal Academicians
Knights Bachelor
Irish emigrants to Great Britain
Irish poets
Irish novelists
Irish dramatists and playwrights
Irish male dramatists and playwrights
Fellows of the Royal Society
Members and Associates of the Royal Birmingham Society of Artists
Irish male novelists
Irish male poets
19th-century Irish male artists
Committee members of the Society for the Diffusion of Useful Knowledge